The 2009 Australia Day Honours are appointments to various orders and honours to recognise and reward good works by Australian citizens. The list was announced on 26 January 2009 by the Governor General of Australia, Quentin Bryce.

The Australia Day Honours are the first of the two major annual honours lists, the first announced to coincide with Australia Day (26 January), with the other being the Queen's Birthday Honours, which are announced on the second Monday in June.

† indicates an award given posthumously.

Order of Australia

Companion (AC)

General Division

Officer (AO)

General Division

Military Division

Member (AM)

General Division

Military Division

Medal of the Order of Australia (OAM)

General Division

Military Division

Meritorious Service

Public Service Medal (PSM)

Australian Police Medal (APM)

Australian Fire Service Medal (AFSM)

Ambulance Service Medal (ASM)

Emergency Service Medal (ESM)

Gallantry, Distinguished and Conspicuous Service

Medal for Gallantry (MG)

Distinguished Service Cross (DSC)

Distinguished Service Medal (DSM)

Commendation for Distinguished Service

Conspicuous Service Cross (CSC)

Conspicuous Service Medal (CSM)

References

2009 awards in Australia
Orders, decorations, and medals of Australia